Lennert Van Eetvelt (born 17 July 2001) is a Belgian cyclist, who currently rides for UCI ProTeam .

Major results

2019
 3rd Overall Aubel–Thimister–Stavelot
1st  Mountains classification
 5th Overall Tour du Pays de Vaud
 8th Overall Course de la Paix Juniors
2021
 National Under-23 Road Championships
1st  Time trial
3rd Road race
 UEC European Under-23 Road Championships
5th Road race
9th Time trial
 5th Liège–Bastogne–Liège Espoirs
 8th Overall Tour Alsace
2022
 1st  Overall Grand Prix Jeseníky
1st Stage 2
 2nd Overall Giro Ciclistico d'Italia
1st Stage 6
 2nd Overall Tour Alsace
 2nd Liège–Bastogne–Liège Espoirs
 2nd Flèche Ardennaise
 3rd Time trial, National Under-23 Road Championships
 6th Overall Tour de Normandie
2023
 2nd Trofeo Serra de Tramuntana
 3rd Trofeo Andratx–Mirador D'es Colomer

References

External links

2001 births
Living people
Belgian male cyclists
People from Tienen